Křižíkova is a Prague Metro station on Line B in the Prague district of Karlín. The station was opened on 22 November 1990 as part of the extension from Florenc to Českomoravská. It was severely damaged in the 2002 floods, but was re-opened after being restored the following year.
The eponymous street adjacent to the station was named after František Křižík, an engineer and inventor who had his factory near the current station.

References

External links

 Gallery and information 

Prague Metro stations
Railway stations opened in 1990
1990 establishments in Czechoslovakia
Railway stations in the Czech Republic opened in the 20th century